Weller is a surname. 

Weller may also refer to:

Business
Weller Flugzeugbau, a German aircraft manufacturer
Weller Pottery, largest American manufacturer of commercial and art pottery in early twentieth century
 Weller, a brand of soldering irons and other electronic products made by Apex Tool Group

Places
Weller, Virginia, an unincorporated community in the United States
Weller Township (disambiguation)